The Clark House is a Ward Wellington Ward-designed home in Syracuse, New York that was listed on the National Register of Historic Places in 1997.

The house was listed for its architecture.

References

Houses in Syracuse, New York
National Register of Historic Places in Broome County, New York
Houses on the National Register of Historic Places in New York (state)
Houses completed in 1919